On the Edge of Reason (Croatian: Na rubu pameti) is a 1938 novel by Miroslav Krleža. It is the only Krleža's novel narrated in first person. The work was written under the influence of Isušena kaljuža (written circa 1906–1910) by Janko Polić Kamov.

Synopsis
Taking the form of a first person, unnamed narrator, the work takes place in Zagreb and follows the downfall of a lawyer who previously lived a monotonous life. After attending a party, surrounded by high class, he sharply criticizes the Director-General, after the latter tells an anecdote how he shot four people for trespassing on his property. He is stigmatized by others around him, eventually being brought to court for slander and ending up in prison.

Reception
Following its initial publication in Zagreb, the work was condemned by a number of critics (mainly on the left) for supposedly equating communism (in its Stalinist form) with fascist methods and for not presenting a genuine worldview. It was, however, praised by more nationally oriented critics.

English translations
It was published in English first by Vanguard Press, followed by New Directions Publishing. Susan Sontag called it "one of the great European novels of the first half of the 20th century". A review for Publishers Weekly described Krleža as a "shrewd observer of man as social animal, and his wry, sardonic style fits cleanly into the Eastern European tradition of bureaucratic satire by the likes of Kafka, Karel Capek and Jaroslav Hasek". Saturday Review in its review of the book called Krleža "One of the most accomplished, profound authors in European literature". In a review for Boston Phoenix, Paul West notes that "the marvel about this novel is that, for all its restrictedness and Balkan didacticism, it remains in the mind as blatant as a tattooed orange, ever perched close to wit, and empirically crisp".

References

External links
On the Edge of Reason on New Direction Books

Works by Miroslav Krleža
Novels by Miroslav Krleža
Philosophical novels
1938 Croatian novels